Berkenwoude is a village in the Netherlands, in the municipality of Krimpenerwaard. Until 1985, it was a separate municipality, when it became part of Bergambacht. Now its a part of the Krimpenerwaard.
The village has approximately 1,500 inhabitants and it is situated in the middle of the Krimpenerwaard.

Former municipalities of South Holland
Populated places in South Holland
Krimpenerwaard